Lucaston is a rural locality in the local government area (LGA) of Huon Valley in the South-east LGA region of Tasmania. The 2016 census recorded a population of 354 for the state suburb of Lucaston.

It is home to Lucaston Park Orchards, which grows raspberries, cherries, plums and apples, and to Pilgrim Hill, a Christian hostel.

Lucaston is also the starting point of the Targa Wrest Point car rally.

History 
The area was formerly known as Bakers Rivulet (or Creek) but late in the 19th century came to be called Lucaston after James Lucas, an early settler. Lucaston was gazetted as a locality in 1970.

Geography
Mountain River, a tributary of the Huon River, forms part of the eastern boundary. Bakers Creek rises in the north-west and flows through to the river on the eastern boundary.

Road infrastructure 
Route C619 (Lollara Road) passes through the south-east corner. Route C645 (Lucaston Road) starts at an intersection with C619 and runs through to the north-east corner, where it exits.

References

Localities of Huon Valley Council
Huon Valley
Towns in Tasmania